Maria Damanaki is a Greek politician, including former president of the Synaspismos party of the left and former state member of the Hellenic Parliament within the Panhellenic Socialist Movement (PASOK). She served as the Global Managing Director for Oceans at The Nature Conservancy. In this capacity leads a global team focused on how the world manages its oceans, including sustainable fisheries management, large-scale protection and restoration of coral reefs and other ecosystems, coastal resilience, and mapping and quantification of the full value of the world's oceans to people.

Early life and education
Damanaki was born in Agios Nikolaos, Crete, in 1952, and studied chemical engineering in the National Technical University of Athens.

Political career
As a student, Damanaki became a member of the Communist Youth of Greece, the youth section of the Communist Party of Greece (KKE), but also became actively involved in the antidictatorial struggle and took part in the Athens Polytechnic uprising. Damanaki was the voice of the famous "Εδώ Πολυτεχνείο" ("This is the Polytechnic") radio broadcast from within the uprising, calling Greek citizens out to support; she was arrested and tortured by the regime.

Member of the Greek Parliament, 1977–1993
From 1977 to 1993 Damanaki was consistently elected member of the Hellenic Parliament, first with the Communist Party and then with Synaspismos, the new party she became president of in 1991. This made her Greece's first female party president, preceded by being the first woman elected as Vice President of Parliament in 1986.

Damanaki was a candidate for mayor of Athens twice, in 1994, supported by Synaspismos, and in 1998, supported by both Synaspismos and PASOK; in the latter year she came second, defeated by Dimitris Avramopoulos,  supported by the conservative party of New Democracy.

European Commissioner, 2010–2014
In November 2009 Damanaki was nominated as the representative of Greece in the European Commission and on 27 November 2009 was elected as the Commissioner-designate for Maritime Affairs and Fisheries, serving from 2010 to 2014. She served for four years as European Union Commissioner for Maritime Affairs and Fisheries.

In her role as Commissioner, the EU was able to bring fish populations back to healthier levels—from five sustainable stocks in 2010 to up to 27 in 2014. In just the next five years, the continuation of her fisheries policy efforts could lead to 15 million more tons of fish in the sea, 30 percent more jobs in Europe and the equivalent of over US$2 billion in additional revenue. She also introduced and implemented the Blue Growth agenda for Seas and Oceans in Europe, which aimed to create 1.6 million new jobs and the equivalent of US$750 billion in revenue by 2020 in sectors such as coastal tourism, ocean energy, and marine biotechnology. In addition, she established legislation to create a common framework for Marine Spatial Planning to map and better manage maritime activities across EU countries.

Writings
Damanaki is also the writer of four books "The female face of power" (Το θηλυκό πρόσωπο της εξουσίας) in 1995, "The return of Politics" (Η επιστροφή της Πολιτικής) in 2001, "The return of politics – the European perspective" in 2004, and "The university in transition" in 2006.

Other activities
European Council on Foreign Relations (ECFR), Member

See also
Politics of Greece

References

External links
Maria Damanaki, her official site in Greek
Maria Damanaki Official EU Media Gallery
Curriculum vitae on the Hellenic Parliament website

|-

|-

1952 births
Chairpersons of Synaspismos
Greek MPs 1977–1981
Greek MPs 1981–1985
Greek MPs 1985–1989
Greek MPs 1989 (June–November)
Greek MPs 1989–1990
Greek MPs 1990–1993
Greek MPs 1996–2000
Greek MPs 2000–2004
Greek MPs 2004–2007
Greek MPs 2007–2009
Greek MPs 2009–2012
Living people
National Technical University of Athens alumni
PASOK politicians
Greek European Commissioners
People from Agios Nikolaos, Crete
Women European Commissioners
20th-century Greek politicians
20th-century Greek women politicians
21st-century Greek politicians
21st-century Greek women politicians